Han Heijenbrock (27 October 1929 – 26 July 2015) was a Dutch rower. He competed in the men's coxed four event at the 1952 Summer Olympics.

References

External link

1929 births
2015 deaths
Dutch male rowers
Olympic rowers of the Netherlands
Rowers at the 1952 Summer Olympics
Rowers from Amsterdam